Elijah Fisher (born January 3, 2004) is a Canadian college basketball player. He  plays for the Texas Tech Red Raiders.

Early life and high school career
Fisher was born in Oshawa, Ontario, the second of five children of Thelia and Rohan Fisher. At age 12, as a seventh-grader, he competed for the under-18 high school team at Crestwood Preparatory College in Toronto. Fisher became the first middle school student to play for Crestwood Prep's varsity team. By the age of 13, he stood 6 ft 5 in (1.96 m). He was considered by many analysts to be the number one player in his class as he entered high school.

Recruiting
Fisher is a consensus five-star recruit and one of the top players in the 2023 recruiting class.

College career
He plays for Texas Tech Red Raiders.

National team career
Fisher represented Canada at the 2021 FIBA Under-19 Basketball World Cup in Latvia. In his national team debut on July 3, he scored 11 points in an 80–71 win over Lithuania. Fisher averaged 6.9 points and 3.4 rebounds per game, helping Canada win the bronze medal.

References

External links
Texas Tech Red Raiders bio

2004 births
Living people
Shooting guards
Small forwards
Basketball people from Ontario
Canadian men's basketball players
Sportspeople from Oshawa